Deeb (in Arabic ديب or ذيب) is a surname (last name). Notable people with the surname include:

Abdul Azim al-Deeb (1929–2010), professor at Qatar University
Abdallah Deeb (born 1987), Jordanian football player of Palestinian origin
Ahmad Deeb (born 1987), Syrian football player
Amer Deeb (born 1980), Jordanian footballer
Dale Deeb (born 1990), South African cricketer
Freddy Deeb (born 1955), professional poker player
G. Michael Deeb, Professor of Surgery at the University of Michigan
Grace Deeb (born 1975), Lebanese singer from Beirut who began her career at the age of fourteen
Khalid Deeb, professional rugby league footballer
Loai Deeb (born 1975) Swedish Palestinian politician, leader of Global Network for Rights and Development (GNRD) and a former member of the municipal council of Sola, Norway
Mahdi Abu Deeb (born 1962), the founder and leader of Bahrain Teachers' Association (BTA)
Richard Deeb (1924–1990), real estate developer
Serena Deeb (born 1986), American professional wrestler
Shaun Deeb (born 1986), American professional poker player
Yassin El-Deeb (born 2004), One of the youngest Egyptian professional full-stack software consultants at SpanTree, LLC who's passionate about improving open-source with his software

See also
Dib (name), variant of Deeb